Gérard Barray (born 2 November 1931 in Toulouse) is a French actor.

Early life and education
Barray's parents split up quickly and his mother, who came from Montauban decided to return to her hometown with her little boy. Around the age of 15, he discovered a passion for jazz; he participated in a few shows in nightclubs while pursuing his studies and obtained a bachelor's degree at the Faculty of Toulouse.
Camille Ricard, an actress and teacher at the Conservatory of Toulouse, who advised him to go to Paris with a letter of recommendation for a friend, Noel Roquevert. Barray enrolled at the Cours Simon, a drama school in Paris. Four years later, Gérard Barray won the Jury Prize.

Career
It will then excel in the roles of knights with a big heart. He starred as D'Artagnan, Pardaillan, Surcouf and Scaramouche. In total there practice gender in a dozen feature films, most of which are box-office success, widely known abroad. Besides films swashbuckling as Pardaillan and Scaramouche and adventure films like Surcouf, Barray turned police commissioner in two San Antonio movies. In 1969, he starred beside young actress Claude Jade in "The Witness". He played Van Britten, a mysterious museum curator who seduces a young English teacher. It was his last major role.

His comeback in 1997 was in Alejandro Amenabar's "Abre los ojos" as Devernois, a TV man.

Gérard Barray was appointed an Officer in the Order of Arts and Letters in January 2010.

Selected filmography

References

External links

Living people
1931 births
French male film actors
French male television actors
Male actors from Toulouse